Fachtna is an Irish personal name and may refer to

 Fachtna of Rosscarbery
 Fachtna of Kiltoom
 Fachtna Fáthach
 Fachtna mac Folachtan
 Fachtna Murphy
 Fachtna Ó hAllgaith
 Saint Fachanan

Irish-language masculine given names